Veruno is a frazione of the  comune (municipality) of Gattico-Veruno in the Province of Novara in the Italian region Piedmont, located about  northeast of Turin and about  north of Novara. It was a separate comune until 2018.
 

Cities and towns in Piedmont